The Wishing Tree may refer to:

Books
 The Wishing Tree, a 1927 children's book by William Faulkner
 The Wishing Tree, a 1975 novel by Sandra Paretti

Film
 The Wishing Tree (film), a 1977 Georgian film by Tengiz Abuladze
 The Wishing Tree, a 1999 American film directed by Ivan Passer; starring Alfre Woodard and Blair Underwood
 The Wishing Tree, a 2012 television film starring Jason Gedrick and Erica Cerra
 The Wishing Tree, a 2017 Indian feature film produced by Raajaysh Chetwal (Rhombus Films) & directed by Manika Sharma; starring Shabana Azmi, Rajit Kapur and Saurabh Shukla

Television episodes
 "Henry and the Wishing Tree", an episode of the British children's television series Thomas & Friends
 "The Tree of Wish", an episode of the Japanese anime series Saint Tail
 "The Wishing Tree" (Chorlton and the Wheelies), an episode of the British animated children's television series Chorlton and the Wheelies
 "The Wishing Tree", an episode of the Australian animated children's television series Tashi, by Flying Bark Productions

Other
Wish Tree, a wish granting tree, found in folklore
 The Wishing Tree (band), a UK folk rock band